Giulio Di Meo (born 26 August 1982) is an Italian tennis player.
Di Meo has a career-high ATP singles ranking of 565 achieved on 2 March 2009. He also has a career-high doubles ranking of 497 achieved on 7 February 2011.

Di Meo has won 1 ATP Challenger doubles title at the 2010 Riviera di Rimini Challenger.

Di Meo has won the ITF World Team and Individual Championships twice. In 2019 in Miami and in 2022 in Lisbon.

Tour titles

Doubles

External links
 
 

1982 births
Living people
Italian male tennis players
21st-century Italian people